In music, Op. 279 stands for Opus number 279. Compositions that are assigned this number include:

 Josef Strauss – Hesperusbahnen
 Johann Strauss II – Morgenblätter